Take a Look is Pamela Moore's solo debut album, released under the now-defunct First American Records in 1981. It has only been released on vinyl. The album sold well regionally and was a stepping stone in Moore's further career.

Track listing
Side A:
"I Lose My Mind"
"Same Old Story"
"Honesty"
"Love Is Leavin'"

Side B:
"Take a Look"
"You're Perfect"
"Gimmie a Little Sign"
"Take All My Love Away"

Credits
Pamela Moore - Vocals

References

Notes

1981 debut albums
Pamela Moore albums